Faculty of Medicine, Dentistry and Health Sciences of the University of Melbourne has the largest number of post-graduate enrolments in the University of Melbourne and also hosts the most school departments and centres of all University of Melbourne Faculties, consisting of 52 faculty sub-organisations. In 2021, Melbourne Medical School was ranked 25th in the world and second in Australia in the 2021 QS Subject Rankings.

History
The University of Melbourne’s School of Medicine was founded in 1858 by Anthony Brownless, a graduate of the University of St Andrews School of Medicine. By Federation in 1901, the school had become the Faculty of Medicine.

When the Murray Committee reported in 1956 on the inadequacies of the nation's tertiary education sector, the mood to change medical education accelerated. The University was central to the revolution to medicalise society through the expansion of medical services. During the decades to follow, the University was the only tertiary institution to mentor the development of a number of medical institutions in South-East Asia and here in Victoria, the Monash Medical School.

In 1989 the University's Faculty of Dental Science amalgamated with Medicine to become the Faculty of Medicine and Dentistry and later expanded again to include Physiotherapy, Psychology and Nursing. 
The University established Australia's first School of Population and Global Health in 2001 and then the School of Rural Health in 2002. As of 2016, the faculty also includes the School of Social Work (having moved from the University of Melbourne Faculty of Arts) as well as the Nossal Institute for Global Health.

In line with the Melbourne Curriculum (formerly the 'Melbourne Model'), the Faculty provides the Bachelor of Biomedicine, a three-year, full-time degree that offers 12 majors across biomedical disciplines.
For the year of 2016 The University of Melbourne attracted more nationally competitive research funding than any other Australian university
In the year of 2010, Medical and Health Sciences at the University of Melbourne achieved the maximum world rating (5) in the Excellence in Research for Australia Report (scale of 1 o 5) in the areas of:
Medical and Health Sciences 
Medical Biochemistry and Metabolomics 
Cardiovascular Medicine and Haematology 
Clinical Sciences Dentistry
Immunology
Neurosciences
Oncology and Carcinogenesis
Ophthalmology and Optometry
Pharmacology and Pharmaceutical Sciences
Medical Physiology
The Melbourne School of Psychological Sciences which forms part of the Faculty is one of the oldest and largest departments of psychology in Australia with its first paper on Psychology written in February 1888 and the Department of Psychology being founded in 1946
In 2011 the Faculty of Medicine, Dentistry and Health Sciences introduced the Doctor of Physiotherapy as Australia’s first three-year entry to practice graduate level program 
The Faculty of Medicine, Dentistry and Health Sciences is the University of Melbourne’s largest faculty

Faculty structure

The Faculty of Medicine, Dentistry and Health Sciences encompasses several Schools directly beneath it. Within each School, there are also several Departments, Research Centres, and Institutes that are contained. Each Department, Research Centre, and Institute can also contain several Research Unit sub-organisations which focus on specific research areas. An overview of the Faculty Schools and structure are as follows:

Melbourne Medical School 

 Department of Clinical Pathology
 Department of Critical Care
 Department of Medicine and Radiology
 Department of Surgery
 Department of Psychiatry
 Department of Paediatrics
 Department of General Practice
 Department of Rural Health
 Department of Medical Education
 Department of Obstetrics & Gynaecology
Mobile Learning Unit

Melbourne Dental School

Melbourne School of Health Sciences 

 Department of Audiology & Speech Pathology
 Department of Nursing
 Centre for Psychiatric Nursing
 Department of Social Work
 Department of Physiotherapy
 Centre for Health, Exercise and Sports Medicine
 Department of Optometry and Vision Sciences

Melbourne School of Population and Global Health 

 Centre for Epidemiology and Biostatistics
 Centre for Health Equity
 Centre for Health Policy
 Centre for Mental Health
 Nossal Institute for Global Health

Melbourne School of Psychological Sciences 

 University Psychology Clinic

School of Biomedical Sciences 

 Department of Anatomy & Neuroscience
 Department of Biochemistry & Molecular Biology
 Department of Microbiology & Immunology
 Microbiological Diagnostic Unit
 Department of Pharmacology and Therapeutics
 Department of Physiology

Faculty Institutes, Centres and Departments 

 Health & Biomedical Informatics Centre
 Melbourne Poche Centre for Indigenous Health
 Melbourne Neuroscience Institute
 Doherty Institute
 Centre for Youth Mental Health
Walter and Eliza Hall Institute of Medical Research (WEHI)
Florey Institute of Neuroscience and Mental Health
 Medical Bionics Department
 The Sir Peter MacCallum Department of Oncology
Peter MacCallum Cancer Centre
Burnet Institute
Murdoch Childrens Research Institute
St. Vincent's Institute of Medical Research

Research
The University of Melbourne was ranked ninth in the world in clinical, pre-clinical and health subjects by the 2018 QS World University Rankings. The Faculty is highly active with over 1400 researchers in eight broad research domains encompassing the breadth of medicine, dentistry and the health sciences.

As of 2016, some examples of research outcomes from the University of Melbourne School of Medicine, Dentistry, and Health Sciences include the Stentrode a collaboration between the University of Melbourne, the Royal Melbourne Hospital and the Florey Institute of Neuroscience and Mental Health, and prosthetic body parts that can simulate touch sensations to amputees.

The Ultrasound Education Group (UEG) is a research and education group within the Department of Surgery, founded by Alistair and Colin Royse in 2004.

UEG’s research topics are transthoracic echocardiogram; transesophageal echocardiography for cardiac surgery; clinical point of care diagnostic ultrasound for heart, vascular, lungs, abdomen, invasive procedures. Other areas of research include cardiothoracic surgery; cardiothoracic anaesthesia; postoperative quality of recovery in surgery; and self-directed learning with ultrasound simulators.

UEG research outcomes include:
 Patients in heart surgery have better probabilities of survival if arteries from their chest wall and arms are used to replumb their heart, instead of leg veins. By scrutinising 51,000 Australian patients, Melbourne researchers discovered the risk of dying prematurely was at least 22 per cent higher if any leg vein was used in coronary bypass surgery
 Cardiac surgery relies heavily on donated blood because of the high blood transfusion rates. But a major study of over 5,000 heart surgery patients has now shown that surgeons can safely use significantly less blood than they have been. The potential saving is equivalent to around one blood donation (about 470 millilitres) per moderate-to-high risk patient.

Criticisms
In 2010 the Faculty drew criticism from the Australian Medical Students' Association (AMSA) over its decision to alter its course structure to allow full fee paying domestic student places:

"The Bradley report into Higher Education stated that participation by students from low socio-economic backgrounds in higher education in Australia needs to be increased. The Federal Government and Universities have been working hard to achieve this aim, which AMSA strongly supports. So for one of Australia's leading Universities to make an active decision to disadvantage students from low socio-economic backgrounds is very disappointing and will undermine much the good work being done around the nation", said Ross Roberts-Thomson, AMSA President. This alteration from labelling the course from "undergraduate" to "post-graduate" was seen as a way of avoiding the Australian Governments ban on full fee paying places for Undergraduate degrees, and as increasing potential barriers for applicants from low socio-economic background from enrolling.

Present and past Faculty Deans
Below is a List of all Faculty of Medicine, Dentistry and Health Science Deans from 1876 to present

1876–1886 George Britton Halford
1886–1889 Harry Brookes Allen
1890–1896 George Britton Halford
1897–1924 Harry Brookes Allen
1925–1929 Richard James Arthur Berry
1929–1938 William Alexander Osborne
1939–1943 Peter MacCallum
1944–1945 Robert Marshall Allan
1946–1947 Roy Douglas Wright
1947–1949 Peter MacCallum
1950–1952 Roy Douglas Wright
1953–1971 Sydney Sunderland
1971–1977 Sydney Lance Townsend
1978–1985 David Geoffrey Penington
1986–1995 Graeme Bruce Ryan
1995–1997 Gordon James Aitken Clunie
1998–2003 Richard Graeme Larkins
2003 – 2013 James Alexander Angus
2013–2015 Stephen Kevin Smith
2015–2016 Mark Hargreaves
2015–Present Shitij Kapur

References

External links
 

Medicine, Dentistry and Health Sciences
Medical schools in Australia
Medical and health organisations based in Victoria (Australia)
Science and technology in Melbourne
Healthcare in Melbourne
Buildings and structures in the City of Melbourne (LGA)